is a Japanese professional basketball team based in Okinawa City, Okinawa. They compete in the B.League, the top-tier professional basketball league of Japan.

Honours

Domestic
bj league champions: 4
2009, 2012, 2014, 2016
Conference champions: 6
2009, 2011, 2012, 2013, 2014, 2016

Continental
ABA Club Championship
3rd: 2011

Players

Coaches
Hernando Planells (2007–08)
Dai Oketani
Koto Toyama
Tsutomu Isa
Norio Sassa
Hiroki Fujita

Seasons

B.League

Notable players

Hilton Armstrong
Chris Ayer
Ira Brown
Draelon Burns
Mo Charlo
Takatoshi Furukawa
Lamont Hamilton
Takumi Ishizaki
Anthony Kent (it)
George Leach
Anthony McHenry
Jeff Newton
Evan Ravenel
Bryan Simpson
Dillion Sneed
Reyshawn Terry
  Kibwe Trim
Terrance Woodbury

Arenas
Okinawa Arena
Okinawa City Gymnasium
Ginowan City Gymnasium

See also
2014–15 Ryukyu Golden Kings season

References

External links 

 
Basketball teams in Japan
Sports teams in Okinawa Prefecture
2007 establishments in Japan